The R133 road is a regional road in south Dublin, Ireland. The road starts at Goatstown and runs in a southerly direction towards Sandyford before acting as a link road for the M50.

Route 
Between its junction with R113 at Motorway Service Road and its junction with R112 at Mount Anville Road via Drummartin Link Road, Drummartin Road and Lower Kilmacud Road all in the county of Dun Laoghaire — Rathdown.

See also
Roads in Ireland
National primary road
National secondary road

References

Roads Act 1993 (Classification of Regional Roads) Order 2006 – Department of Transport

Regional roads in the Republic of Ireland
Roads in County Dublin